Ingrid Park (born February 1971) is a New Zealand television actress. She began her acting career in 1998 appearing in the New Zealand television soap opera series Shortland Street.

Early life and career breakthrough 
Ingrid was born in 1971 in Pahiatua and was raised in Palmerston North. She studied engineering before making her breakthrough television series debut in the 1998 series, Storylines of Shortland Street and also later went onto play the extended role of Dr. Mackenzie Choat in 1999 series, Storylines of Shortland Street.

After gaining fame for playing the role of Dr. Mackenzie Choat in the 1998 series, Storylines of Shortland Street; she also went onto appear in notable television films including Big Fire, Raising Waylon, Spies and Lies. Avalon High and Bloodlines. She extended her television acting career through the 2008 series Go Girls which went onto become one of the successful TV series in New Zealand and appeared in all five season of the series as Britta's mother in the supportive role.

Filmography

Film

Television

References

External links 

1971 births
Living people
New Zealand film actresses
New Zealand television actresses
New Zealand soap opera actresses
20th-century New Zealand actresses
21st-century New Zealand actresses
People from Auckland